Divin Baningime (born 13 October 2000) is a Congolese professional footballer who is a free agent. He last played as a forward for Wigan Athletic.

Club career
Brother of Hearts midfielder Beni, Baningime joined Wigan Athletic at the age of nine in 2010. He made his first-team debut during their EFL Trophy tie against Middlesbrough U23s in October 2017. In October 2019 Baningime joined Curzon Ashton on loan.

On 28 January 2021, Baningime left Wigan Athletic after his contract was terminated by mutual consent.

On 8 September 2021, Baningime returned to Wigan Athletic on a short-term deal.

He scored his first professional goal on 25 January 2022 in a 1-0 win against Arsenal U21s which put his side into the semi-finals of the EFL Trophy.

Career statistics

References

External links

2000 births
Living people
Footballers from Kinshasa
Democratic Republic of the Congo footballers
Association football forwards
Wigan Athletic F.C. players
Curzon Ashton F.C. players
21st-century Democratic Republic of the Congo people
Footballers from Wigan